Chaleshtar castle is a historical castle located in Shahrekord County in Chaharmahal and Bakhtiari Province. The longevity of this fortress dates back to the Qajar dynasty.

References 

Castles in Iran
Qajar castles